The 2020 Oceania Cup was to be the second edition of the Oceania Cup. The competition was scheduled to begin in June and conclude in November, but has since been cancelled due to the COVID-19 pandemic.

The competition would have split six competing nations into two tiered pools.

Fixtures
A schedule was announced in February, though venues and dates were unconfirmed due to the COVID-19 pandemic. On 20 March, it was announced that the June doubleheader had been postponed. In May, the NRL announced that the 2020 NRL Grand Final would be played on 25 October, which further delayed the Oceania Cup. It was eventually cancelled on 4 September 2020.

Pool A

{{rugbyleaguebox
| event     = 2020 Oceania Cup – Pool A
| date      = 20 June 2020
| time      = 
| team1     = 
| score     = Cancelled
| report    = 
| team2     = 
| try1      = 
| goal1     = 
| try2      = 
| goal2     = 
| stadium   = 
| attendance= 
| referee   = 
}}

{{rugbyleaguebox
| event     = 2020 Oceania Cup – Pool A
| date      = 17 October 2020
| time      = 
| team1     = 
| score     = Cancelled
| report    = 
| team2     = 
| try1      = 
| goal1     = 
| try2      = 
| goal2     = 
| stadium   = 
| attendance= 
| referee   = 
}}

{{rugbyleaguebox
| event     = 2020 Oceania Cup – Pool A
| date      = 24 October 2020
| time      = 
| team1     = 
| score     = Cancelled
| report    = 
| team2     = 
| try1      = 
| goal1     = 
| try2      = 
| goal2     = 
| stadium   = 
| attendance= 
| referee   = 
}}

Pool B

{{rugbyleaguebox
| event     = 2020 Oceania Cup – Pool B
| date      = 20 June 2020
| time      = 
| team1     = 
| score     = Cancelled
| report    = 
| team2     = 
| try1      = 
| goal1     = 
| try2      = 
| goal2     = 
| stadium   = 
| attendance= 
| referee   = 
}}

{{rugbyleaguebox
| event     = 2020 Oceania Cup – Pool B
| date      = 17 October 2020
| time      = 
| team1     = 
| score     = Cancelled
| report    = 
| team2     = 
| try1      = 
| goal1     = 
| try2      = 
| goal2     = 
| stadium   = 
| attendance= 
| referee   = 
}}

{{rugbyleaguebox
| event     = 2020 Oceania Cup – Pool B
| date      = 24 October 2020
| time      = 
| team1     = 
| score     = Cancelled
| report    = 
| team2     = 
| try1      = 
| goal1     = 
| try2      = 
| goal2     = 
| stadium   = 
| attendance= 
| referee   = 
}}

See also
 International rugby league in 2020

References

Oceania Cup
Oceania Cup
Oceanian rugby league competitions